Farinheira is a Portuguese smoked sausage made mainly from wheat flour, pork fat and seasonings (white wine, paprika, salt and pepper). It has a yellow/brown colour and is served in traditional dishes like feijoada or cozido à portuguesa. It is also eaten on its own, roasted or fried. In modern versions, it is previously cooked, then peeled and mixed with scrambled eggs and served on bread or toast as a starter.

Although it resembles a chouriço or other meat sausage, its taste is not meaty; it is tangy (but not hot), with a doughy texture and has a somewhat sweet finish in the palate. It is never cooked sliced, unlike other sausages, since its dough-like content would pour out of the skin during cooking, except when fried, or deep-fried, as thick slices.

Farinheiras with PGI 
Some farinheiras made in Portugal have a PGI status:

 Farinheira de Estremoz e Borba, from Estremoz and Borba area, PGI since 2004.
 Farinheira de Portalegre, from Portalegre area, (PGI) since 1997.

See also
 Alheira
 List of sausages
 List of smoked foods
 List of Portugal food and drink products with protected status

References

External links

Portuguese sausages
Smoked meat
Portuguese products with protected designation of origin